Matt Twist is a senior British police officer, serving in the Metropolitan Police from 1996 to 2013 and 2016 to the present, with the intervening period spent in Surrey Police. It was announced in September 2022 that he would become Temporary Assistant Commissioner for Met Operations, where he succeeded Louisa Rolfe.

Career
First assigned to teams in the Royal Borough of Kensington and Chelsea, he also spent time in firearms and Special Branch His time with Surrey Police saw a rise from Chief Superintendent to Temporary Assistant Chief Constable. His second period with the Metropolitan Police included time as Commander for Firearms and Met Taskforce and as the National Police Chiefs’ Council lead for restraint and self-defence, prior to a promotion to Deputy Assistant Commissioner in April 2018, at which rank he served as the Gold Commander for the Metropolitan Police's Covid-19 response.

References

Assistant Commissioners of Police of the Metropolis
Living people
Year of birth missing (living people)